Manchester North Eastern is a parliamentary constituency represented in the House of Representatives of the Jamaican Parliament. Located in Manchester Parish, the constituency was created in 1966. It elects one Member of Parliament (MP) by the first past the post system of election. The current MP is Audley Shaw.

Electoral Divisions 
Manchester North Eastern consists of three divisions: Christiana, Craighead, and Walderston.

Members of Parliament

References 

Parliamentary constituencies of Jamaica
Manchester Parish